Brandon Michael Cunniff (born October 7, 1988) is an American professional baseball pitcher who is a free agent. He previously played in Major League Baseball (MLB) with the Atlanta Braves in 2015.

Career

Florida Marlins
Cunniff was drafted by the Florida Marlins in the 27th round of the 2010 Major League Baseball draft out of California State University San Bernardino. He pitched in the Marlins organization for one year, making 18 appearances before being released.

River City Rascals
From 2011 to 2013 he played in the Frontier League, with the River City Rascals.

Atlanta Braves
Cunniff signed with the Atlanta Braves in June 2013. He compiled a 1.99 ERA in 20 appearances at Class–A Lynchburg. The next year, Cunniff made nine more appearances with Lynchburg until a promotion to the Southern League's Mississippi Braves. At the Double–A level, Cunniff pitched in 33 games, recording a 2.05 ERA.

The Braves added Cunniff to the team's 40-man roster on November 19, 2014. He was invited to spring training in 2015, and sent to the minors as one of the final cuts. After Craig Kimbrel and Melvin Upton, Jr. were traded to the San Diego Padres on April 6, Cunniff was called up. Cunniff went on the disabled list for the first time in his career on June 26, 2015, after suffering a groin strain. He was designated for assignment on December 18, 2015.

Due to a loss of effectiveness arising from a heavy workload in his first Major League Baseball season, Cunniff was not invited to spring training in 2016. Instead, he began the season with the Gwinnett Braves. After two months, Cunniff was demoted to Mississippi, and later called up on August 3 from the Triple–A level. Cunniff was optioned back to Gwinnett on August 12. He spent the rest of August between the major and minor league levels. He was outrighted on November 2, 2016.

Second stint with Marlins
On January 18, 2017, Cunniff signed a minor league contract with the Miami Marlins. On April 14, 2017, while pitching for the Triple-A New Orleans Baby Cakes, Cunniff pitched the ninth inning of a combined no-hitter against the Iowa Cubs, with Scott Copeland pitching the first 7 innings and Hunter Cervenka taking care of the eighth. He elected free agency on November 6, 2017.

Bravos de León
On April 5, 2018, Cunniff signed with the Bravos de León of the Mexican League. He was released on July 3, 2018.

New Britain Bees
On July 14, 2018, Cunniff signed with the New Britain Bees of the Atlantic League. He became a free agent following the 2018 season.

Tigres de Quintana Roo
On February 19, 2019, Cunniff signed with the Tigres de Quintana Roo of the Mexican League. He was released on April 25, 2019.

Olmecas de Tabasco
On May 17, 2019, Cunniff signed with the Olmecas de Tabasco of the Mexican League. He was released on July 16, 2019.

Lincoln Saltdogs
On January 21, 2022, Cunniff signed with the Lincoln Saltdogs of the American Association. In 2022, Cunniff recorded a 1–1 record and 5.11 ERA in 11 appearances with the Saltdogs. On June 16, 2022, Cunniff was released by the Saltdogs.

References

External links

Cal State San Bernardino Coyotes bio

1988 births
Living people
American expatriate baseball players in Mexico
Atlanta Braves players
Baseball players from California
Bravos de León players
Cal State San Bernardino Coyotes baseball players
Charros de Jalisco players
Gulf Coast Braves players
Gulf Coast Marlins players
Gwinnett Braves players
Jamestown Jammers players
Lynchburg Hillcats players
Major League Baseball pitchers
Mexican League baseball pitchers
Mississippi Braves players
New Britain Bees players
New Orleans Baby Cakes players
NMJC Thunderbirds baseball players
Olmecas de Tabasco players
People from Arcadia, California
Peoria Javelinas players
River City Rascals players
Southern Illinois Miners players
Tigres de Quintana Roo players
Venados de Mazatlán players
Mayos de Navojoa players